Spinning Jenny, a literary magazine founded in 1994, primarily publishes poetry. Published annually by Black Dress Press, an independent press in New York City, the magazine is edited by founder C.E. Harrison and designed by Adam B. Bohannon. Distributed to the trade by Ubiquity Distributors, Spinning Jenny belongs to the Council of Literary Magazines and Presses and has received funding from the New York State Council on the Arts.

The most recent issue of Spinning Jenny contains contributions by Maureen Alsop, Bridget Bell, Ana Božičević, Tina Cane, Bruce Cohen, Rhiannon Dickerson, Kyle Flak, Craig Foltz, Lily Ladewig, Stacie Leatherman, Matt Mauch, Bo McGuire, Tracey McTague, James Meetze, Ryan Murphy, Andy Nicholson, JoAnna Novak, Justin Petropoulos, Nate Pritts, Danniel Schoonebeek, Sara Jane Stoner, Paige Taggart, Tony Trigilio, and Jane Wong.

References

External links 
 Official Spinning Jenny website
 Adam B. Bohannon's website
 Review of issue Number 12 at NewPages.com's website
 Review of issue Number 11 at NewPages.com's website
 Review of issue Number 10 at NewPages.com's website
 Review of issue Number 8 at NewPages.com's website
 Council of Literary Magazines & Press's website
 Ubiquity Distributors website

Poetry magazines published in the United States
Annual magazines published in the United States
Magazines established in 1994
Magazines published in New York City
Independent magazines